Scotia Tower is a prominent skyscraper located at 650 West Georgia Street in Downtown Vancouver.

The 15th tallest building in the city, it stands at 138 m or 35 storeys tall and completed in 1977 and is a landmark skyscraper near the end of the central business district. The building houses Scotiabank operations for British Columbia and the underground Vancouver Centre, with its various shops and attendant street retail and theatres. The malls are linked to Pacific Centre and Hudson's Bay and a SkyTrain subway station via subterranean passages beneath Georgia and Granville Streets.

The Georgia and Granville corner of the site was the former location of the Birk's Store in Vancouver, an ornate Edwardian edifice that was torn down in 1974 to make way for construction of the Scotia Tower and Vancouver Centre.  Birk's was the first tenant in the new corner-retail location after the Centre's construction but has since moved to Granville and West Hastings; that location is now the main downtown store of London Drugs.

The Georgia Street side of the Scotia Tower-Vancouver Centre was the location of the old Strand Theatre, the only one of Vancouver's Theatre Row not directly on Granville Street. That movie house was later replaced by the Vancouver Centre Cinemas (now closed) in 1977.

See also
List of tallest buildings in Vancouver

References

Emporis.com

Skyscrapers in Vancouver
Shopping malls in Metro Vancouver
Buildings and structures completed in 1977
Bank buildings in Canada
Modernist architecture in Canada
Scotiabank
Skyscraper office buildings in Canada